The 2022–23 Belmont Bruins men's basketball team represents Belmont University in the 2022–23 NCAA Division I men's basketball season. The Bruins, led by fourth-year head coach Casey Alexander, play their home games at the Curb Event Center in Nashville, Tennessee as first-year members of the Missouri Valley Conference.

Previous season
The Bruins finished the 2020–21 season 25–8, 15–3 in OVC play to finish in second place. They lost in the semifinals of the OVC tournament to Morehead State. They received an invite to the National Invitation Tournament where they lost to Vanderbilt in the first round.

The season marked the school's final season as members of the Ohio Valley Conference.

Preseason 
The Bruins were picked to finish in sixth place in the conference's preseason poll. Guard Ben Sheppard was named to the preseason All-MVC first team.

Roster

Schedule and results

|-
!colspan=12 style=| Regular season

|-
!colspan=12 style=| MVC Tournament

Source

References

Belmont Bruins men's basketball seasons
Belmont Bruins
Belmont Bruins men's basketball